Mariqueen Maandig Reznor (née Maandig; born April 5, 1981) is a Filipino-American singer, songwriter, and musician. 

She is the vocalist for How to Destroy Angels & the former vocalist of Los Angeles-based rock band West Indian Girl.

Career

West Indian Girl (2004–2009)
Maandig was a vocalist for the band West Indian Girl from 2004 to 2009, performing on the albums West Indian Girl and 4th & Wall. 

She appeared in Playboy magazine as the "Becoming Attraction" for the January 2009 issue.

How to Destroy Angels (2010–present)
In 2010, Maandig and her husband Trent Reznor formed the group How to Destroy Angels, along with long-time Reznor collaborator Atticus Ross. 

They have released two EPs named How to Destroy Angels and An Omen, and a studio album, Welcome Oblivion.

Guest appearances
Maandig has worked with LA-based songwriter BAO and appeared as a guest vocalist on two of his band Ming & Ping's songs, "Mixed Melodies" from their eponymous 2009 album and "Chinatown" from 2012's The Darkness of Night. 

She also provided backing vocals on the track "She's Gone Away" on Nine Inch Nails' 2016 EP Not the Actual Events, as well as on “Less Than" off the band's 2017 EP Add Violence.

Personal life
Maandig married Trent Reznor in October 2009. They have four sons and a daughter together.

Discography
With How to Destroy Angels

 How to Destroy Angels (2010)
 An Omen EP (2012)
 Welcome Oblivion (2013)

With West Indian Girl
 West Indian Girl (2004)
 4th & Wall (2007)

References

External links
 

1981 births
American women singer-songwriters
American singer-songwriters
Living people
American musicians of Filipino descent
Place of birth missing (living people)
American industrial musicians
How to Destroy Angels (band) members
21st-century American singers
21st-century American women singers